Prevertebral may refer to:

Prevertebral fascia
Prevertebral ganglia
Prevertebral muscles
Prevertebral plexus
Prevertebral space